Coralline means "resembling coral" and may refer to:

 Coralline algae, whose fronds are covered with calcareous deposits.
 Coralline rock, formed by the death of layers of coralline algae.
 Sclerosponges, sometimes called "coralline sponges".
 Other organisms that resemble coral, such as certain bryozoans or hydrozoans.